Bettye Frink (born February 19, 1933) is a politician from Alabama. She served as State Auditor from 1963 to 1967 and 1975 to 1983. She also served as Secretary of State of Alabama from 1959 to 1963.

From 1955 through 1957 Mrs. Frink was employed by the U.S. Treasury Dispersing Office and the Internal Revenue Service. Mrs. Frink was chosen to the first elected State Board of Education and served until 1975. In 1960 she was a delegate, state-at-large to the Democratic National Convention.

Frink is married to William David Frink and they have four children.

References

1933 births
Living people
Alabama Democrats
Secretaries of State of Alabama
State Auditors of Alabama
Women state constitutional officers of Alabama
20th-century American politicians
20th-century American women politicians
21st-century American women